James David Vance (born James Donald Bowman; August 2, 1984) is an American venture capitalist, author, and politician serving as the junior United States senator from Ohio since 2023. A member of the Republican Party, he came to prominence with his 2016 memoir, Hillbilly Elegy.

Born in Middletown, Ohio, Vance studied political science and philosophy at Ohio State University before earning a degree from Yale Law School. His memoir, which describes his upbringing in Middletown and his family's Appalachian values, became a New York Times bestseller and attracted significant press attention during the 2016 United States presidential election. Vance launched his first political campaign for Ohio's Senate seat in 2021 and won the Republican nomination. He defeated Democratic nominee Tim Ryan in the general election.

Early life and education
James David Vance was born on August 2, 1984, in Middletown, Ohio, between Cincinnati and Dayton, as James Donald Bowman, the son of Donald Bowman and Bev Vance. Of Scots-Irish descent, his mother and father divorced when Vance was a toddler. Shortly afterward, he was adopted by his mother's third husband. Vance and his sister were raised primarily by his grandparents, James and Bonnie Vance, whom they called "Mamaw and Papaw." J. D. later went by the name James Hamel, his stepfather's surname, until adopting the surname Vance in honor of his grandparents.

Vance was educated at Middletown High School, a public high school in his hometown. After graduating, he enlisted in the U.S. Marine Corps and served in the Iraq War as a combat correspondent with the 2nd Marine Aircraft Wing. Vance later graduated summa cum laude from Ohio State University with a Bachelor of Arts degree in political science and philosophy. While at Ohio State, he worked for Republican Ohio State Senator Bob Schuler.

After graduating from Ohio State, Vance earned a Juris Doctor degree from Yale Law School. During his first year, his professor Amy Chua, author of Battle Hymn of the Tiger Mother, persuaded him to write his memoir.

Career

After working at a corporate law firm, Vance moved to San Francisco to work in the tech industry. He served as a principal at Peter Thiel's venture capital firm, Mithril Capital.

In 2016, Harper published Vance's book, Hillbilly Elegy: A Memoir of a Family and Culture in Crisis. It was on The New York Times Best Seller list in 2016 and 2017. It was a finalist for the 2017 Dayton Literary Peace Prize and winner of the 2017 Audie Award for Nonfiction. The New York Times called it "one of the six best books to help understand Trump's win". The Washington Post called him the "voice of the Rust Belt", while The New Republic criticized him as "liberal media's favorite white trash–splainer" and the "false prophet of blue America." Economist William Easterly, a West Virginia native, criticized the book, writing, "Sloppy analysis of collections of people—coastal elites, flyover America, Muslims, immigrants, people without college degrees, you name it—has become routine. And it's killing our politics."

In December 2016, Vance indicated that he planned to move to Ohio to start a nonprofit, potentially run for office, and work on combating drug addiction in the Rust Belt.

In 2017, Vance joined Revolution LLC, an investment firm founded by AOL cofounder Steve Case, as an investment partner, where he was tasked with expanding the "Rise of the Rest" initiative, which focuses on growing investments in under-served regions outside the Silicon Valley and New York City tech bubbles.

In January 2017, Vance became a CNN contributor. In April 2017, Ron Howard signed on to direct a film version of Hillbilly Elegy, which Netflix released in 2020, and which starred Owen Asztalos and Gabriel Basso as Vance.

In 2019, Vance co-founded Narya Capital in Cincinnati, with financial backing from Thiel, Eric Schmidt, and Marc Andreessen. In 2020, he raised $93 million for the firm. With Thiel and former Trump adviser Darren Blanton, Vance has invested in the Canadian online video platform Rumble, a right-wing alternative to YouTube.

U.S. Senate

Elections

2022 

In early 2018, Vance reportedly considered a bid for U.S. Senate as a Republican running against Democrat Sherrod Brown, but declined to run. In April 2021, he expressed interest in running for the Senate seat being vacated by Republican Rob Portman.

Peter Thiel gave $10 million to Protect Ohio Values, a super PAC, created in February 2021 to support Vance in running for the 2022 U.S. Senate election in Ohio. Robert Mercer also gave an undisclosed amount. In May 2021, Vance launched an exploratory committee. In July 2021, he officially entered the race; it was his first campaign for public office.

On May 3, 2022, Vance won the Republican primary with 32% of the vote, defeating multiple candidates, including Josh Mandel (23%) and Matt Dolan (22%). In the November 8, 2022, general election, He defeated Democratic nominee Tim Ryan by 6.1%.

Tenure 
Vance was sworn in to the U.S. Senate on January 3, 2023. He is the first U.S. senator from Ohio to take office without holding previous government experience. 

Vance has gained significant media attention for his response to the 2023 train derailment in East Palestine, Ohio. He was criticized for a delayed response to the derailment, with an official statement from his office released on February 13. Vance and others countered that he had responded to the derailment the day after it occurred, sooner than fellow Ohio Senator Sherrod Brown.

On February 26, Vance wrote an op-ed in The Washington Post supporting the provision of PPP style funds to those affected by the derailment, which some Republican senators criticized. On March 1, Vance, Brown, and Senators John Fetterman, Bob Casey, Josh Hawley, and Marco Rubio proposed legislation to prevent another rail derailment like the one in East Palestine. The bill has received bipartisan Senate support.

Political positions 
Vance has been called a populist conservative.

Social issues 
Vance opposes abortion, and he has indicated that he may support a federal ban on abortions after 15 weeks. He has also said that abortion laws can be set by the states. When asked whether abortion laws should include exceptions for rape and incest, he said, "two wrong[s] don't make a right."

Vance opposes the Respect for Marriage Act and has said, "I believe that marriage is between one man and one woman, but I don't think the gay marriage issue is alive right now. I'm not one of these guys who's looking to try to take people's families and rip them apart."

Immigration 
Vance once admonished Trump for demonizing immigrants, but has repeatedly called illegal immigration "dirty". In 2022, he told Tucker Carlson that Democrats "have decided that they can't win reelection in 2022 unless they bring a large number of new voters to replace the voters that are already here." This led to allegations that Vance was endorsing the white supremacist Great Replacement conspiracy theory, according to which there is an effort to replace white Americans with immigrants. He has supported Trump's proposal for a wall along the southern border and rejected the idea that advocates for the border wall are racist. He has also proposed spending $3 billion to finish Trump's wall.

Views on childlessness, divorce, and domestic abuse
In a 2021 speech to the Intercollegiate Studies Institute, Vance blamed "the childless left" for America's woes. He praised far-right Hungarian prime minister Viktor Orban for encouraging married couples to have children, and that parents should "have a bigger say in how democracy functions" than non-parents.

In September 2021, while speaking at Pacifica Christian High School in California, Vance said, "This is one of the great tricks that I think the sexual revolution pulled on the American populace, which is the idea that, like, 'well, OK, these marriages were fundamentally, you know, they were maybe even violent, but certainly they were unhappy. And so getting rid of them and making it easier for people to shift spouses like they change their underwear, that's going to make people happier in the long term.'" Vice wrote that Vance "seemed to suggest that in some cases, 'even violent' marriages should continue." In response to Vice, Vance claimed that rates of domestic violence had "skyrocketed" in recent years due to what he called "modern society's war on families". In recent decades, rates of domestic violence have decreased. A strategist for Vance called Vices characterization misleading and said Vance does not support people staying in abusive relationships.

Views on drug smuggling
During his 2022 U.S. Senate campaign, Vance said that President Joe Biden was flooding Ohio with illegal drugs by not enforcing security at the southern border, a claim The New York Times called "blatantly false".

Relationship with Donald Trump 
During the 2016 U.S. presidential election, Vance was an outspoken critic of Republican nominee Donald Trump. In a February 2016 USA Today column, he wrote that "Trump's actual policy proposals, such as they are, range from immoral to absurd." In October 2016, he called Trump "reprehensible" in a post on Twitter, and described himself as a "never-Trump guy."

By February 2018, Vance began changing his opinion, saying Trump "is one of the few political leaders in America that recognizes the frustration that exists in large parts of Ohio, Pennsylvania, eastern Kentucky and so forth".

Vance supported Trump in 2020. In July 2021, he apologized for calling Trump "reprehensible" and deleted posts from 2016 from his Twitter account that were critical of Trump. Vance said that he now thought Trump was a good president and expressed regret about his criticism during the 2016 election. Vance visited Mar-a-Lago to meet with Trump and Peter Thiel ahead of an official announcement regarding his U.S. Senate campaign.

In October 2021, Vance reiterated Trump's claims of election fraud, saying that Trump lost the 2020 presidential election because of widespread voter fraud.

On April 15, 2022, Trump endorsed Vance for U.S. Senate. On April 18, Vance's former law school roommate, politician Josh McLaurin, leaked private messages that Vance had sent him in 2016 in which Vance questioned whether Trump would become another "cynical asshole" like Richard Nixon or "America's Hitler". Vance also stated his intention to vote for independent presidential candidate Evan McMullin in the 2016 presidential election.

Personal life
Vance has been married to a former law school classmate, Usha Chilukuri Vance, since 2014. They have three children. For much of his professional career, Vance and his family have lived in San Francisco, where they were active in community gardening.

Vance was raised in a "conservative, evangelical" branch of Protestantism, but by September 2016, he was "thinking very seriously about converting to Catholicism" but was "not an active participant" in any particular religious denomination. In August 2019, Vance was baptized and confirmed in the Catholic Church in a ceremony at St. Gertrude Priory in Cincinnati, Ohio. He chose Augustine of Hippo as his Confirmation saint. Vance said he converted because he "became persuaded over time that Catholicism was true", and described Catholic theology's influence on his political views.

Also in 2019, the first issue of The Lamp, which has since been called "a Catholic version of The New Yorker", included an essay by Vance describing the reasons for his conversion to Roman Catholicism.

Works

References

External links

J. D. Vance official U.S. Senate website
Campaign website

|-

|-

|-

1984 births
Living people
21st-century American businesspeople
21st-century American male writers
21st-century American memoirists
21st-century American politicians
American nationalists
American Roman Catholics
American people of Scotch-Irish descent
American venture capitalists
Businesspeople from Ohio
Businesspeople from the San Francisco Bay Area
Catholics from Ohio
Converts to Roman Catholicism from Evangelicalism
Criticism of Donald Trump
Ohio Republicans
Ohio State University College of Arts and Sciences alumni
People from Middletown, Ohio
Republican Party (United States) politicians
Republican Party United States senators from Ohio
Right-wing populism in the United States
United States Marine Corps personnel of the Iraq War
United States Marines
Yale Law School alumni